Rajinder (Raj) Singh Ghai  (born 12 June 1960 in Jalandhar, India)is a former Indian cricketer. He played Ranji Trophy for 10 years and captained the Punjab State team for 3 years. He also went on to play for Indian cricket team, India from 1984 to 1986. Playing in his very first one-day international game against England he got Wicket of Tim Robinson in his very first over which is a rare feat. Praised by the press as one of the fastest Indian Bowler of his time along with Kapil Dev and Chetan Sharma, Raj was also famous for his hard hitting batsmanship, having achieved a highest score of 114 not-out against "Services" in 1986.
Raj now calls San Diego, California home since last 28-year and is very active in the local cricket community. He played for San Diego Cricket Club in 1991 and has over time won many championships for his team. He was part of the US selection panel for 4 years and was inducted into Southern California Cricket Association (SCCA) Hall of Fame in 2015. He was also honored as the Cricketer of the Century by the Southern California Cricket Association.

References

Punjab, India cricketers
Indian cricketers
India One Day International cricketers
North Zone cricketers
1960 births
Living people
Cricketers from Jalandhar